This article details the 2013 Indonesian Premier League.

Week 5

Week 4

Week 3

Week 2

Week 1

References

fix